John Twiname Gardner (2 August 1854, in South Molton – 15 February 1914, in Kensington) was a general practitioner and composer of much published parlour and light music. From 1888 to 1903 he worked as a family doctor in Ilfracombe, North Devon, where he conducted the local choral society and was generally a mainstay of musical life in the town. He was the grandfather of the well-known composer John Gardner.

J.T. Gardner's White Star Polka March  was held in the music libraries of the ships of the White Star Line, including Titanic.

List of published compositions

Instrumental Works 
Bella Vista  (Valse)
Britannia - a Patriotic Selection - Francis, Day & Hunter Ltd. (1901)
Carissima  (Waltz) - Francis Day and Hunter  (1897)
Celestine (Valse) - Francis Brothers and Day
Cherie (Valse) - Francis Brothers and Day
Clair de Lune (Valse) -Francis Brothers and Day
Danse des Lutins - Francis Brothers and Day
Ma Vie  (Valse) -Frances Day and Hunter
Marjorie  (Gavotte) - Francis Brothers and Day
Mavourneen  (Waltz)- Francis Day and Hunter (1899)
Minuet in A -Willcocks and Co
The Pullman Express (Descriptive galop) - Francis Day and Hunter (1904)
Querida (Valse) -  Francis Day and Hunter (1892)
Le Reve d'Amour - Francis Brothers and Day
White Star (Polka March) - Francis Day and Hunter

Vocal Works 
Against the Stream			
The Better Land - Willcocks & Co.
The Children's Prayer	
Caught at Last - Willcocks & Co.
Come May with all thy flowers - Marriott & Williams
Come back my love to me	 - Marriott & Williams
Dearest to me - Willcocks & Co.
The Drummer Boy - W.W. Warne
God Bless the Royal Pair - Twiss & Sons, Ilfracombe (1893)	
God Save the King - Novello & Co. 
Jesu, Lover of my Soul - Willcocks & Co.
The Merry Muleteer - Marriott & Williams (1892)
Old Friends - Marriott & Williams
Peaceful be thy sleeping  - Willcocks & Co.
The Roseate Hues - Willcocks & Co.
The song we ne'er may sing -B. Mocatta & Co.
We Fear no Foreign Foe - Marriott & Williams
Zingarella - J.B. Cramer & Co.

1854 births
1914 deaths
19th-century English medical doctors
English composers
People from South Molton
Musicians from Devon
19th-century English musicians